Dreams So Real is an album by vibraphonist Gary Burton featuring compositions by Carla Bley recorded in 1975 and released on the ECM label. It features Burton with guitarists Mick Goodrick and Pat Metheny, bassist Steve Swallow and drummer Bob Moses. The album reached number twenty-five in Billboards Jazz albums charts.

Reception 
AllMusic awarded the album 4½ stars while its review by Michael G. Nastos states, "Generally regarded as one of Burton's top three recorded dates, it has stood the test of time. Perhaps some day, a complete collection of the vibist playing Carla Bley's many other compositions can be compiled to complement this surface-scratching but very important album".

Track listing 
All compositions by Carla Bley.

Personnel 
 Gary Burton – vibraphone
 Mick Goodrick – guitar
 Pat Metheny – electric 12-string guitar
 Steve Swallow – bass guitar
 Bob Moses – drums

Charts

References 

ECM Records albums
Gary Burton albums
1976 albums
Albums produced by Manfred Eicher